To Any Lengths (other English-language titles are Maigret and the Fortuneteller and Signed, Picpus) is a detective novel by Belgian writer Georges Simenon, featuring his character inspector Jules Maigret.

Translations
The book has been translated three times into English: in 1950 as To Any Lengths  and in 1989 as Maigret and the Fortuneteller translated by Geoffrey Sainsbury and in 2015 as Signed, Picpus translated by David Coward.

Adaptations
The novel has been adapted several times for cinema and television:

In French
1968: as Signé Picpus, with Jean Richard in the lead role;
2003: as Signé Picpus, with Bruno Cremer;

In Italian
1965: as L'affare Picpus, with Gino Cervi in the main role;

In English
1962: as The Crystal Ball, with Rupert Davies;

In Japanese
1978: as Keishi to satsujin yōkoku, with Kinya Aikawa in Maigret's role;

Literature
Maurice Piron, Michel Lemoine, L'Univers de Simenon, guide des romans et nouvelles (1931-1972) de Georges Simenon, Presses de la Cité, 1983, p. 298-299

External links

Maigret at trussel.com

References

1944 Belgian novels
Maigret novels
Novels set in France
Novels set in the 20th century